Gurudhakshaneiy is a 1969 Indian Tamil-language drama film directed by A. P. Nagarajan. The film stars Sivaji Ganesan, Jayalalithaa, Padmini and K. Balaji. It was released on 14 June 1969.

Plot 

Kannan is an uneducated, hardworking, village farmer who is known to be quick in anger. Kanni is his lover. To the village, comes Devaki who is a teacher. Jealous elements starts to spread rumors about Kannan and Devaki much to the chagrin of her father. However, Devaki is already engaged to Vasudevan, whose opinion alone matters to Devaki. Ponni also trusts Kannan. In the climax, it is revealed that Kannan has been secretly getting educated unable to bear the shame of doing so in public. Vasudevan absolutely trusts Devaki even without questioning as does Kanni and everyone's doubts are cleared.

Cast 
Sivaji Ganesan as Kannan
Jayalalithaa as Kanni
Padmini as Devaki
K. Balaji as Vasudevan
Major Sundarrajan as Devaki's Father
S. V. Sahasranamam as Vasudevan's Father
M. N. Nambiar as Singapur Singaram
T. S. Balaiah as Nambothiri
K. A. Thangavelu as Raouthar
T. R. Ramachandran as Mama
T. Rama Rao as Nayar
P. D. Sambandam as James
Manorama as Ponnathal
Rama Prabha as Valli
G. Sakunthala as Savithiri
Senthamarai as Sevathan
Pakoda Kadhar as Student
Master Prabhakar as Vadivelu

Soundtrack 
The music was composed by Pukazhenthi, supervised by K. V. Mahadevan, with lyrics by Kannadasan.

Release and reception 
Gurudhakshaneiy was released on 14 June 1969. The Indian Express called it "a sad attempt at portraying an unlettered villager becoming not only literate but a hero capable of great sacrifice."

References

External links 
 

1960s Tamil-language films
1969 drama films
1969 films
Films directed by A. P. Nagarajan
Indian drama films